Group D of the 1998 Fed Cup Europe/Africa Zone Group II was one of five pools in the Europe/Africa zone of the 1998 Fed Cup. Five teams competed in a round robin competition, with the top team advancing to Group I for 1999.

Georgia vs. Moldova

Estonia vs. Iceland

Ireland vs. Bosnia and Herzegovina

Georgia vs. Bosnia and Herzegovina

Estonia vs. Ireland

Moldova vs. Iceland

Georgia vs. Iceland

Estonia vs. Bosnia and Herzegovina

Ireland vs. Moldova

Georgia vs. Ireland

Estonia vs. Moldova

Bosnia and Herzegovina vs. Iceland

Georgia vs. Estonia

Ireland vs. Iceland

Bosnia and Herzegovina vs. Moldova

  placed first in this group and thus advanced to Group I for 1999, where they placed last in their pool of four and was thus relegated back to Group II for 2000.

See also
Fed Cup structure

References

External links
 Fed Cup website

1998 Fed Cup Europe/Africa Zone